Rashtriya Dal ('National Party') was a faction formed in 1960 by the teachers' representatives in the Uttar Pradesh Legislative Council, India. At the time, the Legislative Council had 12 teachers as members, as well as 4 former teachers. Rashtriya Dal was recognized by the speaker as a Legislative Council group. However, it was disbanded within a year, and the teachers' representatives were split along partisan lines.

References

Defunct political parties in Uttar Pradesh
Political parties established in 1960
1960 establishments in Uttar Pradesh
Political parties disestablished in 1961
1961 disestablishments in India